Japan competed at the 2022 World Athletics Championships in Eugene, Oregon from 15 to 24 July 2022. Japan entered 68 athletes. They finished with one gold medal, two silver, and a bronze medal.

Medalists

Results

Men
Track and road events

 Field events

Women 
 Track and road events

 Field events

Mixed
Track and road events

References 

Nations at the 2022 World Athletics Championships
World Championships in Athletics
2022